The General Bank of Bengal and Bihar (alternate spelling: General Bank of Bengal and Bahar) was a bank founded in the year 1773 in British India. The bank was the fourth oldest bank in India.
The bank became defunct March 31st, 1775.

History

Founding  

The bank was established in 1773 by Warren Hastings, the very first Viceroy of India.

During the early years of the British rule in India, a need was felt for a bank that would service the British employees of the East India Company. Many banks were founded as a result, and the General Bank of Bengal and Bihar was one such bank.

Management 

Although the bank was largely a private bank, it enjoyed patronage from the then government of India, the East India Company.

The bank was staffed by mostly British nationals who were drawn mainly from the East India Company.

Final Years 

The bank lasted in business for only two years and was finally closed in 1775.

The bank also issued its own currency notes in its two years of existence.

Legacy 

The bank is notable for being the fourth oldest bank in India. It is also notable for being one of the first institutions in India to issue its own paper banknotes or currency notes.

The ability of private banks to issue their own currency notes was taken away by The Paper Currency Act, 1861.

See also

Indian banking
List of banks in India
List of oldest banks in India

References

External links
 History of the Bank
 Banking in India

Defunct banks of India
Companies based in Kolkata
Banks established in 1773